Vercauteren is a surname. Notable people with the surname include:

 Franky Vercauteren (born 1956), Belgian footballer
 Joseph Vercauteren, professor at the University of Pharmacy of Bordeaux, France